The FC Eddersheim is a German association football club from the town of Hattersheim am Main, Hesse.

The club's greatest success came in 2012 when it earned promotion to the Hessenliga, the highest football league in Hesse, but it was relegated again after only one season.

History
FC Eddersheim was formed on 12 December 1931. The club played in local amateur football for the first six decades of its existence until 1996, when it won the Bezirksliga and earned promotion to the Bezirksoberliga. Six seasons later the club won a championship in this league, too and earned promotion to the tier five Landesliga.

FC played the next nine seasons in the Landesliga Hessen-Mitte, renamed to Verbandsliga Hessen-Mitte in 2008. During that time the club finished runners-up on three occasions, 2007, 2009 and 2012. It failed in its first two attempts in the promotion round to the Hessenliga in 2007 and 2009 but succeeded in 2012. The 2012–13 Hessenliga season however proved unsuccessful to the club, finishing seventeenth and being relegated again.

Since then the club has been playing in the Verbandsliga again.

Honours
The club's honours:
 Verbandsliga Hessen-Mitte
 Runners-up: 2007, 2009, 2012
 Bezirksoberliga Wiesbaden
 Champions: 2002
 Bezirksliga Main-Taunus
 Champions: 1996

Recent seasons
The recent season-by-season performance of the club:

With the introduction of the Regionalligas in 1994 and the 3. Liga in 2008 as the new third tier, below the 2. Bundesliga, all leagues below dropped one tier. Alongside the introduction of the 3. Liga in 2008, a number of football leagues in Hesse were renamed, with the Oberliga Hessen renamed to Hessenliga, the Landesliga to Verbandsliga, the Bezirksoberliga to Gruppenliga and the Bezirksliga to Kreisoberliga.

Key

References

External links
 Official team site 
 Das deutsche Fußball-Archiv  Historical German domestic league tables

Football clubs in Germany
Football clubs in Hesse
Association football clubs established in 1931
1931 establishments in Germany